Michelle Bright was a 17-year-old who was found raped and murdered in New South Wales, Australia.  She was last seen at 12:45 am on 27 February 1999 by a friend who dropped her off in Mayne Street, Gulgong following a friend's 15th birthday party that day. The Minister for Police, Michael Daley announced that the NSW Government offered a reward of $500,000 to solve the murder of Bright, the second-highest reward offered in NSW (the highest being the reward offered for the recovery of William Tyrrell). The  police regard Bright's death as a  horrific crime.

On 10 August 2020 the reward was raised to $1,000,000. On 11 August 2022, 53-year-old Craig Henry Rumsby, a former neighbour of Bright's, was arrested for her murder, in addition to assault charges against an 18-year-old committed in 1998.

References 

Deaths by person in Australia
Incidents of violence against girls
Murder in New South Wales
Murdered Australian children
Unsolved murders in Australia
1999 murders in Australia